The ACC on Regional Sports Networks (also known as simply ACC RSN) is a package of telecasts produced by Raycom Sports, in cooperation with Bally Sports, featuring Atlantic Coast Conference (ACC) college sports. The package is syndicated primarily to regional sports networks, with Bally Sports accounting for the majority of their affiliates. Out of market these telecasts stream on ACC Network Extra for subscribers to ESPN's ACC Network.

History
The practice of distributing ACC sports telecasts to regional networks began with the original Jefferson-Pilot syndication package for football and Raycom/JP package for basketball in the 1980s. At that time Raycom and JP would distribute ACC telecasts through AT&T network lines to local over the air affiliates. Raycom Sports would continue to distribute ACC telecasts, mostly football and men's basketball under what became the ACC Network, to over the air affiliates until the 2019 ACC men's basketball tournament, when ESPN acquired Raycom Sports' previous package of games for its new ACC Network cable channel.

The practice of distributing ACC sports to regional sports networks started in 2011 after the signing of a new 12-year agreement between the ACC, ESPN and Raycom Sports. The agreement gave Raycom Sports the ability to syndicate a select number of football, basketball and Olympic sports on regional sports networks.

As the majority of the ACC's RSN affiliates were part of Fox Sports Networks, these events initially used Fox Sports' branding and on-air presentation (with football and basketball using the standard Fox College Football and Fox College Hoops branding respectively). With the acquisition of FSN by Sinclair Broadcast Group and their rebranding in late-March 2021, the telecasts now use Bally Sports' on-air presentation.

In August 2022, Bally and Raycom agreed to move 11 women’s basketball tournament early-round games and 12 baseball tournament early-round games, which previously aired as part of the package, to the ACC Network.

Telecasts
Currently the ACC on Regional Sports Networks consists of football, men's and women's basketball, baseball, softball, and a limited number of soccer, field hockey, and volleyball matches. The package contains around 16 football games per year, around 40 men's basketball games, and 25 women's basketball games. 

It previously aired early-round coverage of the ACC women's basketball tournament and ACC baseball tournament until 2022, when ESPN reached an agreement with Raycom Sports and Bally Sports to move coverage of these two events to ACC Network.

Affiliates
Affiliates differ slightly game to game due to existing commitments by RSNs to local teams.

Affiliates include:
 
 Bally Sports Arizona
 Bally Sports Detroit
 Bally Sports Florida
 Bally Sports Great Lakes
 Bally Sports Midwest
 Bally Sports North
 Bally Sports San Diego
 Bally Sports SoCal
 Bally Sports South
 Bally Sports Southwest
 Bally Sports Sun
 Bally Sports Wisconsin
 Marquee Sports Network
 MASN
 NESN
 YES Network

On air staff
Mike Gminski: color commentar
Tom Werme: play-by-play
Cory Alexander: color commentator 
James Bates: color commentator
Lyndsay Rowley: sideline reporter
Evan Lepler: play-by-play
Charles Arbuckle: color commentator
Ashley ShahAhmadi: sideline reporter
Bob Rathbun: play-by-play
Brian Jordan: color commentator
Abby LaBar: sideline reporter
Eric Collins: play-by-play
Dan Bonner: color commentator

See also
MVC Network, a similar package of telecasts on regional sports networks for the Missouri Valley Conference

References

Atlantic Coast Conference
College basketball on television in the United States
College football on television